Roanoke is a city in Denton County, Texas, United States and part of the Dallas–Fort Worth Metroplex. The population was 5,962 at the 2010 census. With a 2020 population of 10,537, it is the 236th largest city in Texas and the 2991st largest city in the United States. Roanoke is currently growing at a rate of 3.77% annually and its population has increased by 76.74% since the most recent census, which recorded a population of 5,962 in 2010. A small part of the city extends into Tarrant. It's nicknamed as "The Unique Dining Capital of Texas." The city was originally founded after competition with Elizabethtown, located just off Highway 114. Settlers from Elizabethtown eventually moved to Roanoke permanently, and Elizabethtown currently resides as a ghost town.

The main east-west road through town, State Highway 114 Business, is named "Byron Nelson Boulevard" in honor of the golfer who resided in the community. Roanoke is home to many restaurants, as well as a hotel that bank robbers Bonnie and Clyde resided in during the 1930s.

Geography

Roanoke is located at  (33.005002, –97.226282).

In November 2007, the town of Marshall Creek consolidated with Roanoke.

Climate

The climate in this area is characterized by hot, humid summers and generally mild to cool winters.  According to the Köppen Climate Classification system, Roanoke has a humid subtropical climate, abbreviated "Cfa" on climate maps.

Demographics

As of the 2020 United States census, there were 9,665 people, 3,229 households, and 2,236 families residing in the city.

Local government

The City of Roanoke was incorporated in 1933, operates under a Council-Manager form of government and provides the following services: general government, police and fire protection, emergency ambulance service, road and traffic signal maintenance, water and wastewater operations, parks and recreational facilities, courts, library services, building inspection, and development services. According to the city's 2012–2013 Comprehensive Annual Financial Report, the city's various funds had $37.2 million in revenues, $24.2 million in expenditures, $91.9 million in total assets, $38.4 million in total liabilities, and $12.1 million in cash and investments.

The structure of the management and coordination of city services in 2015 was:

Entertainment

Hawaiian Falls Roanoke, Cinemark Movie Theater, Roanoke Skatepark, and Evenings on Oak Street (Summer concert series every Thursday night on Oak Street).

Top employers

According to Roanoke's 2020 Comprehensive Annual Financial Report, the top employers in the city were:

Education

Roanoke is served by the noted Northwest Independent School District. Elementary school students attend Roanoke Elementary School, Wayne A. Cox Elementary School, J. Lyndall Hughes Elementary School, and Granger Elementary. Middle school students attend Medlin Middle School or John Tidwell Middle School, and high school students go to Byron Nelson High School in Trophy Club. Also, Roanoke is home to James Steele Accelerated High School, an NISD high school for students who want to graduate from high school in 2 1/2 to 3 years.

References

External links

 City of Roanoke official website
 Roanoke Register, newspaper

Cities in Denton County, Texas
Cities in Texas
Dallas–Fort Worth metroplex